Chishima Maeda (born 4 March 1997) is a Japanese judoka.

She is the gold medallist of the 2019 Judo Grand Prix Budapest in the -52 kg category.

References

External links
 

1997 births
Living people
Japanese female judoka
21st-century Japanese women